William Walter Cargill (27 August 1784 – 6 August 1860) was the founder of the Otago settlement in New Zealand, after serving as an officer in the British Army. He was a member of parliament and Otago's first Superintendent.

Early life

Cargill was born in Edinburgh, Scotland, in 1784. His parents were James Cargill and Marrion Jamieson. His father died of alcoholism when he was 15. He joined the British Army in 1802 and served with distinction in India, Spain, and France. In 1813, he married Mary Ann Yates; they had seventeen children. Of these, two of his five sons became notable in public life: John, who followed in his father's footsteps and became a politician, and Edward, a prominent businessman and politician. Family circumstances forced him to sell his commission in 1820, though he was later referred to as "Captain Cargill". After leaving the army, he became a wine merchant in Scotland.

On 24 November 1847, Cargill sailed for New Zealand on the ship John Wickliffe, arriving at what is now Port Chalmers, Otago on 23 March 1848.

Political career

The New Zealand Constitution Act 1852 granted the settler population self-government, and in 1853 Cargill was elected Superintendent of the Otago Province. Cargill also served as a Member of Parliament for Dunedin Country. He was elected unopposed on 11 December 1855. He served the multi-member electorate alongside his son John. He rarely spoke in the house and found travel to parliament in Auckland difficult. Aged 75, he announced his resignation from public office in October 1859; he died less than a year later. He was described as a "unabashed provincialist".

Death and legacy

He died of a stroke on 6 August 1860, at his home "Hillside" in Dunedin, and is buried in Dunedin Southern Cemetery with his wife and three children.

His granddaughter Isabel Cargill travelled to Italy with Ann Marie Babington and in 1893 they opened Babington's tea room on the Spanish Steps in Rome which still today belongs to her descendants.  

Numerous names have connections with Cargill. The city of Invercargill is named for him (Inver coming from the Scots Gaelic word inbhir meaning a river's mouth), as is Mount Cargill, which towers above northern Dunedin. "Cargill's Corner" is a major road intersection in South Dunedin, and one of the roads which crosses at it is Hillside Road, named for Cargill's house. A Tasmanian sandstone monument to Cargill, simply known as the Cargill Monument, was built in Dunedin in 1863–64.

Cargill's Castle, a ruined stately home above St Clair is not named for William Cargill, but for his son Edward.

References

External links

William Cargill Te Ara – The Encyclopedia of New Zealand

|-

1784 births
1860 deaths
Members of the New Zealand House of Representatives
Superintendents of New Zealand provincial councils
Scottish emigrants to New Zealand
History of Dunedin
New Zealand MPs for Dunedin electorates
Burials at Dunedin Southern Cemetery
Settlers of Otago
19th-century New Zealand politicians
William